Radnor Township is one of the eighteen townships of Delaware County, Ohio, United States. As of the 2010 census the population was 1,540, up from 1,335 at the 2000 census.

Geography
Located in the northwestern part of the county, it borders the following townships:
Prospect Township, Marion County - north
Waldo Township, Marion County - northeast corner
Marlboro Township - northeast, south of Waldo Township
Troy Township - east
Delaware Township - southeast
Scioto Township - southwest
Thompson Township - west

No municipalities are located in Radnor Township, although the unincorporated community of Radnor lies at the center of the township.

Name and history
The name Radnor is derived from Radnorshire, Wales, the native land of a first settler.   It is the only Radnor Township statewide.

Government
The township is governed by a three-member board of trustees, who are elected in November of odd-numbered years to a four-year term beginning on the following January 1. Two are elected in the year after the presidential election and one is elected in the year before it. There is also an elected township fiscal officer, who serves a four-year term beginning on April 1 of the year after the election, which is held in November of the year before the presidential election. Vacancies in the fiscal officership or on the board of trustees are filled by the remaining trustees.

Public services
Emergency medical services in Radnor Township are provided by the Delaware County EMS.

References

External links
Township website
County website

Townships in Delaware County, Ohio
Townships in Ohio
Welsh-American culture in Ohio